Rodney Dwayne Artmore (born June 14, 1974 in Galveston, Texas.) is a former defensive back in the National Football League.

Career
Artmore played with the Green Bay Packers during the 1999 NFL season. He played at the collegiate level at Baylor University.

See also
List of Green Bay Packers players

References

1974 births
Sportspeople from Galveston, Texas
Green Bay Packers players
American football defensive backs
Baylor University alumni
Baylor Bears football players
Living people
Amarillo Dusters players
Players of American football from Texas